Revueltas Sánchez is the surname of the children of Gregorio Revueltas Gutiérrez (1871-1923) and his wife Romana Sánchez Arias (1883-1939), a Mexican artist family with roots in Durango. They had twelve children. The family lived in Guadalajara, Jalisco after 1910, before they moved to Mexico City in 1913.

Notable family members 
 Consuelo Revueltas Sánchez (1909–1990), naïve artist
 Fermín Revueltas Sánchez (1901–1935), painter
 José Revueltas Sánchez (1914–1976), writer and political activist
 Rosaura Revueltas Sánchez (1910–1996), actress and writer
 Silvestre Revueltas Sánchez (1899-1940), composer, violinist and conductor
 Agustin Revueltas Sanchez (1920-1996) artist, businessman

Notable descendants 
 Children of José:
 Román Revueltas Retes (b. 1952), violinist, journalist, and painter
 Children of Silvestre:
 Eugenia Revueltas Acevedo (b. 1934), writer
 Carmen Revueltas Klarecy (later Carmen Montoya and Carmen Peers, born c. 1920–died 1995), ballet and flamenco dancer
  Children of Agustin
Arthur P. Revueltas (b. 1954), educator, deputy superintendent, Montebello Unified School District

Further reading 
 R. Revueltas Sánchez Los Revueltas: Biografía de una familia (Spanish), 1979.

References 

Mexican families
Artist families
People from Durango